Artyom Aleksandrovich Zagrebin (born 15 August 1988) is a Russian former professional football player.

Club career
He made his Russian Football National League debut for FC Khimik Dzerzhinsk on 27 October 2013 in a game against FC Luch-Energiya Vladivostok.

External links
 

1988 births
People from Dzerzhinsk, Russia
Living people
Russian footballers
Association football goalkeepers
FC Tambov players
FC Khimik Dzerzhinsk players
Sportspeople from Nizhny Novgorod Oblast